The Buckinghamshire Building Society was founded in 1907 in Chalfont St Giles by a group of local businessmen as the Chalfont & District Permanent Building Society. It was renamed the Buckinghamshire in 1961. The Society has 11,000 investing Members, 1,000 borrowers and assets of £243m in 2013.

References

External links 
Buckinghamshire Building Society
Building Societies Association

Building societies of England
Banks established in 1907
Organizations established in 1907
1907 establishments in England